Carlton E. Brown is retired former president of Clark Atlanta University in Atlanta, Georgia, a position he assumed on August 1, 2008. He served as president of Savannah State University from July 1, 1997 until December 31, 2006.

Personal life

Education
Brown studied English (with an emphasis in American Studies) at the University of Massachusetts in Amherst, Massachusetts graduating in 1971. He then returned to the University of Massachusetts for doctoral study. He completed his doctoral studies in 1979, earning the Ed.D. in Multicultural Education (emphases in educational change and organizational development).

Brown is married to T. LaVerne Ricks-Brown, a former teacher and a 1972 graduate of Hampton University. They have two children.

According to a DNA analysis, his ancestry comes from the Yoruba people and Fulani people of Nigeria.

Career

Early career
After completing his undergraduate education, Brown worked as a high school teacher and counselor for three years. While pursuing his doctoral degree, he served as a Program Planning Specialist and as a Program Development Specialist for the National Alternative Schools Program.

From 1979 until 1987 Brown served on the faculty of the School of Education of Old Dominion University in Norfolk, Virginia. In 1987, Dr. Brown was hired by Hampton University as the Dean of the School of Education. He engineered the creation of the School of Liberal Arts and Education at Hampton in 1990. In 1996, Brown was promoted to Vice President for Planning and Dean of the Graduate College at Hampton.

President, Savannah State University
Brown became SSU’s eleventh president on July 1, 1997, replacing  John T. Wolfe Jr. His term as president of the university ended on December 31, 2006.

President, Clark Atlanta University
Clark Atlanta University confirmed on February 15, 2008 that Walter Doyce Broadnax would officially retire on July 31, 2008 and that Brown, the university's executive vice president, would assume the duties as the interim president on August 1, 2008. On May 16, 2008, the Clark Atlanta Board of Trustees at its regular meeting, appointed Brown as the university's third president, effective August 1, 2008, and he served as president until 2015.

AGB

Brown is currently working with AGB Institutional Strategies, a higher-education consulting firm.

Suggested reading

References

20th-century births
Living people
Presidents of Savannah State University
African-American academics
Clark Atlanta University faculty
University of Massachusetts Amherst alumni
Yoruba academics
People from Macon, Georgia
Academics from Georgia (U.S. state)
Year of birth missing (living people)
21st-century African-American people
20th-century African-American people